"More Than I Knew" is a song by Canadian singer Deborah Cox. It was written by Cox along with Big Jim and Jimmy Jam and Terry Lewis for her fifth studio album The Promise (2008), while production was helmed by Jim, Jam and Lewis. The ballad was released as the album's lead single in September 2008 and peaked at number 22 on the US Billboard Adult R&B Songs.

Track listings

Charts

References

2008 songs
2008 singles
Deborah Cox songs
Songs written by Jimmy Jam and Terry Lewis
Songs written by Deborah Cox